Guatemala–Mexico relations are the historical and current bilateral relations between Guatemala and Mexico. Both nations are members of the Association of Caribbean States, Community of Latin American and Caribbean States, Organization of American States, Organization of Ibero-American States and the United Nations.

History

Guatemala and Mexico are two neighboring countries who share a common cultural history from the Maya civilization and both nations were colonized by the Spanish empire. In 1821, Mexico gained independence from Spain and administered Guatemala (and most of Central America) during the First Mexican Empire. In 1823, the empire collapsed and Guatemala joined the United Provinces of Central America, however, the Guatemalan region of Chiapas choose to separate from Guatemala and joined Mexico as a state. In 1838 the union dissolved and Guatemala became an independent nation. Both nations established diplomatic relations in 1838 and diplomatic missions were soon opened. In 1926 both nations resident diplomatic missions were elevated to embassies.

In 1954, reformist Guatemalan President Jacobo Árbenz was ousted in an American backed coup d'état and replaced by a military junta; because of his disputes and opposition against the United Fruit Company. This incident was known as the 1954 Guatemalan coup d'état. After resigning from the presidency, Árbenz and his family and several other political allies; were allowed to seek asylum in the Mexican embassy. After several weeks in the embassy, Árbenz, his family and political followers were allowed to leave the country for Mexico where he died in 1971.

In December 1958, both nations were very close to declaring war on each other after an incident involving the Guatemalan navy firing upon Mexican fishing boats off the coast of Guatemala and killing three fisherman and wounding fourteen others. Soon after the attack diplomatic relations were severed and troops were mobilized to the border on both sides and Mexican fighter planes entered Guatemalan airspace to attack the country's main international airport, however, just before the attack was to take place, newly elected Mexican President Adolfo López Mateos  called off the attack. In September 1959, with the mediation of Brazil and Chile; diplomatic relations between Guatemala and Mexico were re-established. This incident was known as the Mexico–Guatemala conflict.

From 1960 to 1996, Guatemala became engaged in a civil war. During this time period, Mexico became home to approximately 80,000 Guatemalan refugees and asylum seekers, most of them of indigenous descent. Since the end of the civil war, relations between both nations have greatly improved and both nations work together to combat human trafficking, organized crime and narcotics.

In August 2018, then Mexican President-elect Andrés Manuel López Obrador met with Guatemalan President Jimmy Morales in Tuxtla Gutiérrez, Chiapas, the first Head of Government with whom he held a meeting with after winning the elections.  President Morales returned to Mexico to attended the inauguration of President López Obrador in Mexico City, on 1 December 2018.

In 2020, Guatemalan President Alejandro Giammattei paid a visit to Mexico. In May 2021, President Giammattei returned to Mexico on a State visit and along with President López Obrador, both leaders issued an apology to the Mayan communities of their respective nations. In May 2022, Mexican President Andrés Manuel López Obrador paid an official visit to Guatemala, the first stop of his tour to Central America.

High-level visits

Presidential visits from Guatemala to Mexico

 President Kjell Eugenio Laugerud García (1976)
 President Óscar Humberto Mejía Victores (1985)
 President Vinicio Cerezo (1986, 1988, 1990)
 President Jorge Serrano Elías (1991, 1993)
 President Álvaro Arzú (1996)
 President Alfonso Portillo (2000, 2002)
 President Óscar Berger (2005, 2006, 2007)
 President Álvaro Colom (2010, 2011)
 President Otto Pérez Molina (2014, 2015)
 President Jimmy Morales (2018)
 President Alejandro Giammattei (2020, March & September 2021)

Presidential visits from Mexico to Guatemala

 President Gustavo Díaz Ordaz (1966)
 President Luis Echeverría (1975)
 President José López Portillo (1981)
 President Miguel de la Madrid Hurtado (1987)
 President Carlos Salinas de Gortari (1991, 1992)
 President Ernesto Zedillo (1995, 1996, 2000)
 President Vicente Fox (2004, 2006)
 President Felipe Calderón (2008, 2009, 2011, 2012)
 President Enrique Peña Nieto (2013, 2017, 2018)
 President Andrés Manuel López Obrador (2022)

Bilateral agreements
Both nations have signed several bilateral agreements such as a Treaty on Border limits (1882); Agreement on Telecommunications (1963); Agreement for the Protection and Restitution of Archaeological, Artistic and Historical Monuments between both nations (1975); Agreement on Touristic Cooperation (1987); Agreement on Cooperation for the Prevention and Attention in Cases of Natural Disasters (1987); Agreement on the Protection and Improvement of the Environment in the Border Zone (1987); Agreement on Air Transportation (1992); Treaty on Enforcement of Criminal Sentences (1996); Treaty of Cooperation on Mutual Legal Assistance (1996); Treaty for the Recovery and Return of Stolen Vehicles and Aircraft or Matter of Illicit Disposition (1997); Extradition Treaty (1997); Agreement on Scientific and Technical Cooperation (1998); Treaty of Mutual Cooperation for the Exchange of Information regarding Financial Transactions carried out through Financial Institutions to Prevent, Detect and Combat Operations of Illegal Origin or Money Laundering (2002); Agreement on the Mutual Recognition of Certificates of Studies, Degrees and Academic Degrees at the Primary, Secondary and Upper Secondary Level or their Equivalents (2009); Agreement on Educational, Cultural and Sports Cooperation (2011) and an Agreement on Cooperation to Combat the Illicit Traffic in Narcotic Drugs, Psychotropic Substances, Chemical Precursors, Essential Chemicals and Products or Preparations Containing them, their Related Offenses, as well as the Drug dependency (2015).

Migration

Each year, thousands of Guatemalan migrants enter Mexico through its unsecured border and mainly transit through the country on their way to the United States. Many leave their country for better opportunities in the United States and Mexico and to escape rampant violence in Guatemala. In 2013, Mexico apprehended and deported over 30,000 Guatemalan nationals back to their country. In 2010, there were registered 35,322 legal residents from Guatemala living in Mexico. There are also several thousand Guatemalan citizens who cross the border on a daily basis to work in Mexico and return to Guatemala at the end of the day.

Governments of both nations have pledged to increase and improve consular affairs for Guatemalan nationals transiting through Mexico and for improved protection and respect of rights for the migrants in Mexico and to combat Mexican drug cartels operating in Guatemala. In 2018, several thousands Guatemalans formed part of the Central American migrant caravans and traversed all of Mexico to the northern city of Tijuana to request asylum in the United States. In 2018–2019, Guatemalans requesting asylum in Mexico had increased by 224%. Many are choosing to remain in Mexico rather than face the uncertainty of trying to request asylum in the US and also not wishing to be denied and deported back to Guatemala.

Transportation and border crossing
There are direct flight between both nations with Aeroméxico, Aeroméxico Connect, Volaris and Volaris Costa Rica. There are also several border crossings along the Guatemala–Mexico border.

Trade relations
In 2001, Guatemala and Mexico signed a free trade agreement (along with El Salvador and Honduras) known as the Mexico-Northern Triangle Free Trade Agreement. In 2018, trade between Guatemala and Mexico totaled US$2.2 billion. Guatemala's main exports to Mexico include: edible fats and oil, rubber, textiles, paper and boards, vinegar, prepared meat and seafood. Mexico's main exports to Guatemala include: plastic material, machinery, mechanical appliances, iron, steel, perfume and cosmetics.

Guatemala is ranked as the seventh-biggest recipient of Mexican investments. Over the years, several multi-national Mexican companies have based themselves in the country and invested over US$2.6 billion. Mexican multinational companies such as América Móvil, Banco Azteca, Gruma, Grupo Bimbo and Grupo Elektra (among others) operate in Guatemala.

Resident diplomatic missions

See also
 Chiapas (incl. Soconusco), a Mexican state that was claimed by Guatemala until 1895
 El Norte (film)
 Guatemalan Mexicans
 Guatemala–Mexico border
 Immigration to Guatemala
 Mexico–Guatemala conflict, 1958-1959

References 

 
Mexico
Bilateral relations of Mexico